Tisethor ("Companion of Horus") was a princess of ancient Egypt, a daughter of Princess Kekheretnebti and granddaughter of the King Djedkare Isesi. Her father is not known. She was a niece of Neserkauhor, Meret-Isesi and Isesi-ankh. 

She barely reached the age of puberty when she died. She was buried in the mastaba of her mother.

References

24th-century BC women
Princesses of the Fifth Dynasty of Egypt